The Raid on Yarmouth, on 3 November 1914, was an attack by the Imperial German Navy on the British North Sea port and town of Great Yarmouth. German shells only landed on the beach causing little damage to the town, after German ships laying mines offshore were interrupted by British destroyers. The British submarine  was sunk by a German mine as it was leaving harbour to attack the German ships. A German armoured cruiser was sunk after striking two German mines outside its home port.

Background
In October 1914, the Imperial German Navy sought ways to reduce the numerical superiority of the Royal Navy. A fleet engagement was too risky when the German fleet was so badly outnumbered. The Germans planned to attack British ships individually or in small groups, gradually reducing the British superiority in numbers. The Kaiser had ordered that no fleet action was to take place but small groups of ships might still take part in raids. The German raids were to mine British waters, to pick off solitary ships or to entice larger groups into pursuing and being ambushed by the German High Seas Fleet, in relatively safe waters near Germany.

Raiding British coastal towns might force the Royal Navy to alter the disposition of its ships to protect them. The British kept the greater part of the Grand Fleet together, so it would have superiority if it engaged the German Navy. The Germans hoped to encourage the British to detach more ships from the Grand Fleet for coastal defence, increasing the likelihood that the German Navy could attack isolated ships before the Grand Fleet could intervene.

Prelude
Mines were to be laid off Yarmouth and Lowestoft and the ships were to bombard Yarmouth with their guns.

Raid

At 16:30 on 2 November 1914, the battlecruiser squadron left its base on the Jade River. Two squadrons of German battleships followed slightly later, to lie in wait for ships that the battlecruisers might have lured. By midnight, the squadron was sufficiently north to be passing fishing trawlers from various countries. By 06:30 on 3 November, the patrol sighted a marker buoy at "Smith's Knoll Watch", allowing them to determine their exact position and close in to Yarmouth. Halcyon spotted two cruisers, which she challenged. The response came in the form of shellfire from small and then larger guns. Arthur Pollen wrote that

Lively—some  behind—started to make smoke to hide the ships. German shooting was less accurate than it might have been because all the battlecruisers fired upon her at once, making it harder for each ship to see their fall of shot and correct their aim. At 07:40, Hipper ceased firing at Lively and directed some shells toward Yarmouth, which hit the beach. Once Stralsund had finished laying mines, the ships departed.

Halcyon—out of immediate danger—radioed a warning of the presence of German ships. The destroyer  moved to join them, while three more destroyers in harbour began raising steam. The submarines ,  and —inside the harbour—moved out to join the chase, but D5 struck a mine and sank. At 08:30, Halcyon returned to harbour and provided a report of what had happened.

At 09:55, Admiral David Beatty was ordered south with a battlecruiser squadron and squadrons of the Grand Fleet following from Ireland. German ships waited overnight in Schillig Roads for fog to clear before returning to harbour. In the fog, the armoured cruiser —which was travelling from the Jade Bay to Wilhelmshaven—went off course and hit two mines. A number of the crew survived by sitting on the wreck of the ship, which had sunk in shallow water but at least 235 men were killed (reports vary).

Aftermath

Admiral Hipper was awarded an Iron Cross but refused to wear it, feeling little had been accomplished. Although the results were not spectacular, German commanders were heartened by the ease with which Hipper had arrived and departed and were encouraged to try again. The lack of reaction from the British had been due partly to news that morning of a much more serious loss at the Battle of Coronel and because Admiral John Jellicoe, commander of the Grand Fleet, was on a train returning to his ships at the time of the raid. According to Winston Churchill, the First Lord of the Admiralty, the British could not believe there was nothing more to the raid than briefly shelling Yarmouth and were waiting for something else to happen.

Orders of battle

Royal Navy
 , minesweeper, flagship
 , destroyer
 , destroyer
 , destroyer
 , submarine
 , submarine
 , submarine

Imperial German Navy
 , battlecruiser, flagship
 , battlecruiser
 , battlecruiser
 , armoured cruiser
 , light cruiser
 , light cruiser
 , light cruiser
 , light cruiser

See also
 Raid on Scarborough, Hartlepool and Whitby (1914)
 Bombardment of Yarmouth and Lowestoft (1916)

Notes

References

 
 
 
 
 
 

Yarmouth
Conflicts in 1914
Yarmouth
Yarmouth
Yarmouth
Yarmouth
Great Yarmouth
Yarmouth
20th century in Norfolk
Maritime incidents in the United Kingdom
November 1914 events
Germany–United Kingdom military relations